Destan Haciya, also spelled as Destan Hadzhija or Destan Hadžija, (born 2 August 1993) is a Macedonian football striker of Turkish descent.

Club career
Born in Macedonian capital Skopje, Haciya played with FK Rabotnički between 2011 and 2015. In summer 2015 he joined lower-league side FK Ljubanci 1974 but during the winter-break he was brought by FK Makedonija Gjorče Petrov playing with them the second half of the 2016–17 Macedonian First Football League. Makedonija finished bottom and was relegated, but since Haciya was regular in the squad, he got attention from other clubs. It will be Serbian side FK Borac Čačak that will sign him after trials on 30 August 2017. Haciya made a debut for Borac in the 2017–18 Serbian SuperLiga on 24 September, as a substitute in an away game against FK Čukarički.

References

1993 births
Living people
Footballers from Skopje
Association football forwards
Macedonian footballers
FK Rabotnički players
FK Ljubanci 1974 players
FK Makedonija Gjorče Petrov players
FK Borac Čačak players
Macedonian First Football League players
Serbian SuperLiga players
Macedonian expatriate footballers
Expatriate footballers in Serbia
Macedonian expatriate sportspeople in Serbia